Daniel Sosa: Maleducado is a Netflix stand-up comedy special by Mexican comic Daniel Sosa, his second Netflix stand-up special for Netflix following Daniel Sosa: Sosafado. In Maleducado, directed by Marcos Bucay, Daniel Sosa talks about his childhood, Mexican traditions, a problem with the Disney movie Coco and more.

Cast
 Daniel Sosa

Release
It was released on June 27, 2019 on Netflix streaming.

References

External links
 
 
 

2019 television specials
Netflix specials
Stand-up comedy concert films
Sosa, Daniel: Maleducado